P2Y purinoceptor 13 is a protein that in humans is encoded by the P2RY13 gene.

The product of this gene, P2Y13, belongs to the family of G-protein coupled receptors. This family has several receptor subtypes with different pharmacological selectivity, which overlaps in some cases, for various adenosine and uridine nucleotides. This receptor is activated by ADP. Two transcript variants encoding the same protein have been identified for this gene.

See also
 P2Y receptor

References

Further reading

External links

G protein-coupled receptors